Maréchal Foch may refer to:

 Ferdinand Foch (1851–1929), French general, Marshal of France and Allied Supreme Commander in World War I
 Marechal Foch (grape), a red wine grape variety named for Ferdinand Foch